Banning Lyon was a plaintiff in a 1990s class action lawsuit against National Medical Enterprises, now Tenet Healthcare. His involvement in the lawsuit led to the publication of an autobiographical op-ed piece in The New York Times in October, 1993. Lyon was born and raised in Southern California and was a founding member of the Hagfish punk Rock band.

Music
Banning Lyon co-founded the punk rock band Hagfish with Doni and Zach Blair in 1991. Lyon drummed for the band for approximately two years, opening for bands such as ALL, Swervedriver, and Poster Children. He finally left the band after several break ups when tensions between members and line up changes left his relationship with the Blair brothers difficult.

Lyon went on to reunite with Jarrod King (guitar) and Jef King (vocals), with Damon Earnheart on bass, to form the skate punk band Cleaners, based in the Dallas/Ft. Worth metroplex. They recorded and released Walking on Eggshells before ultimately splitting up in 1999.

Class action lawsuit
Shortly after his finally leaving Hagfish in 1993 Lyon became involved in a class action suit against National Medical Enterprises (NME). NME is now known as Tenet Healthcare. The suit was led by Robert Andrews of the law firm Andrews and Clark located in Ft. Worth, Texas.

Lyon authored an autobiographical op-ed piece for The New York Times that was published on October 13, 1993.  The article details his experience with having been hospitalized in Brookhaven Psychiatric Pavilion, a hospital owned by NME. Less than a week later, on October 18, Business Week published an article detailing Lyon’s story, going on to reveal further details regarding the Federal government’s involvement in an ongoing investigation of NME. That investigation led to what would become one of the largest health-care-fraud cases in American medical history. 

Shortly after the publishing of the articles National Medical Enterprises agreed to settle out of court. In June 1994, Peter Alexis and NME pleaded guilty to federal criminal and civil charges that included paying kickbacks to doctors in return for patient referrals. The chain paid a $379 million fine. At the time it was the largest fine levied for health care fraud.

In February 1995 the doctors that had been defendants in the class action suit in which Lyon had been involved sued Lyon, his attorney Robert Andrews, and others. The doctors claimed that Lyon and the others had defamed them, citing Lyon’s statements made in the Dallas Morning News and Business Week.  The case was ultimately dropped by the doctors.

Outdoors
In the summer of 2010 Lyon lived and worked as first mate aboard the SV Valora based out of Vineyard Haven, Massachusetts. He was briefly featured in an article in the Martha's Vineyard Times.

Lyon now lives in northern California and works as an outdoor educator.

References

American punk rock musicians
Class action lawsuits
Yosemite National Park